Volhynian Vice-royalty was an administrative-territorial division of the Russian Empire, created at the end of 1795 after the third Partition of Poland from the territory of the Izyaslav Viceroyalty and Wołyń Voivodeship.

References

Viceroyalties of the Russian Empire
History of Volhynia
States and territories established in 1792
1790s establishments in the Russian Empire